Meagan Lee Warthold (born  in Melbourne) is an Australian female weightlifter, competing in the 58 kg category and representing Australia at international competitions. 

She participated at the 2000 Summer Olympics in the 58 kg event.

Major results

References

External links
 

1972 births
Living people
Australian female weightlifters
Weightlifters at the 2000 Summer Olympics
Olympic weightlifters of Australia
People from Melbourne
20th-century Australian women
21st-century Australian women